The Ohio State Buckeyes women's ice hockey program represented The Ohio State University during the 2014-15 NCAA Division I women's ice hockey season.

Offseason
August 12: Sara and Kari Schmitt were invited to participate in the USA Hockey Women’s National Festival in Lake Placid, N.Y.

Recruiting

Roster

2014–15 Buckeyes

Schedule

|-
!colspan=12 style=""| Regular Season

|-
!colspan=12 style=""| WCHA Tournament

Awards and honors

Kassidy Sauve (Goaltender), WCHA All-Rookie Team

References

Ohio State
Ohio State Buckeyes women's ice hockey seasons
Ohio State
Ohio State Buckeyes
Ohio State Buckeyes